Aminoaldehydes and aminoketones are organic compounds that contain an amine functional group as well as either a aldehyde or ketone functional group.  These compounds are important in biology and in chemical synthesis.  Because of their bifunctional nature, they have attracted much attention from chemists.

Tertiary amine derivatives
Because primary and secondary amines react with aldehydes and ketones, the most common variety of these aminocarbonyl compounds feature tertiary amines.  Such compounds are produced by amination of α-haloketones and α-haloaldehydes. Examples include cathinones, methadone, molindone, pimeclone, ferruginine, and tropinone.

Secondary amine derivatives
Aminoketones containing secondary amines are typically stable when the ketone is located on a ring, e.g. 4-piperidinone, triacetonamine, acridone

Primary amine derivatives

Most members of this class are unstable towards self-condensation, however some important examples do exist as intermediates in biosynthetic pathways e.g. glutamate-1-semialdehyde. The acyclic forms of certain amino sugars also qualify, for instance vancosamine. Aminoacetaldehyde, the simplest member of this subclass, is highly reactive toward self-condensation. Aminoacetaldehyde diethylacetal, (EtO)2CHCH2NH2, is a stable analogue that is commercially available. 2-Aminobenzaldehyde with the formula C6H4(NH2)CHO is a prominent aromatic aminoaldehyde.  The compound is unstable with respect to self-condensation

Aminoacetone is a prominent member of this class of compounds.  It is unstable under normal laboratory conditions, but the hydrochloride [CH3C(O)CH2NH3]Cl is readily isolable.

Aminoacetone is derived from decarboxylation of alanine.  Aminoacetaldehyde is produced by the hydroxylation of taurine.

References 

Amines
Ketones
Aldehydes